"Terre" (meaning "Earth") is a song by Canadian singer Celine Dion, recorded for her 1998 French-language album, S'il suffisait d'aimer. It was written by French songwriter and producer Erick Benzi, and produced by Jean-Jacques Goldman and Benzi. Although not released as a single, "Terre" entered the Quebec airplay chart in October 1998 and peaked at number eight.

Commercial performance
After the release of S'il suffisait d'aimer, radio stations in Quebec started playing "Terre". Although not released as a single, it entered the Quebec chart on 17 October 1998 and peaked at number eight. It spent fourteen weeks on the chart in total.

Charts

Live performances
Dion performed "Terre" on selected dates on her "Let's talk about love World Tour", her "Sans Attendre Tour" and during some first shows in the "Courage World Tour".

References

External links

Celine Dion songs
French-language songs
1998 songs